Bahamas Customs & Excise Department is the agency of the Bahamian government responsible for collecting revenue and taxes. It was established on March 21, 1914, by an act of the Bahamian Legislature known as an Act to provide for the establishment of a Customs Department. About 55% to 60% of revenue collected in the Bahamas is collected by the agency. Its headquarters is located at Customs House on Thompson Boulevard in Nassau, Bahamas. BCS is housed under the portfolio of the Bahamas Ministry of Finance. The current Comptroller of Customs is Dr. Geannine Moss.

References

External links
 Bahamas Customs Service, official website

Government of the Bahamas
Economy of the Bahamas